Gold in Clay (Spanish: Entre el barro) is a 1939  Argentine musical film directed by Luis Bayon Herrera. The tango film premiered in Buenos Aires and stars Tito Lusiardo.

Cast
 Tito Lusiardo   
 Pedro Maratea   
 Severo Fernández   
 Enrique Roldán   
 Benita Puértolas   
 Dorita Ferreyro   
  Cielito   
 Héctor Coire   
 Lucía Galán   
 Carlos Rosingana   
 Vicente Forastieri   
 Aída Gómez   
 Ernesto Villegas   
 Alfredo Pozzio   
 Nelly Nolby

External links

1939 films
1930s Spanish-language films
Argentine black-and-white films
Tango films
Films directed by Luis Bayón Herrera
1939 musical films
Argentine musical films
1930s Argentine films